Rovensko is a village and municipality administered as part of Senica District in the Trnava Region of western Slovakia. The village is about 5 km NNE of the town of Senica and is close to the border with the Czech Republic.

History 
In historical records the village was first mentioned in 1439.

Geography 
The municipality lies at an altitude of 216 metres and covers an area of 1,040 hectares. In 2007 the population was 393.

Notes

External links 

 http://www.statistics.sk/mosmis/eng/run.html

Villages and municipalities in Senica District